Paul George McCracken (born September 11, 1950) is an American former professional basketball player.

Early life
McCracken was born in New York, New York.  He attended high school at Hillhouse High School in New Haven, Connecticut.

College career
For college, McCracken went to California State University, Northridge.  He set the school single-season record for rebounds, with 330, in 1970–71. A two-time All-American, two-time All-California Collegiate Athletic Association selection, and 1972 CCAA MVP, he was inducted into the college's Matador Hall of Fame in 1993.

Professional career
He made his NBA debut on February 6, 1973, becoming the first player from Northridge to play in the NBA.  McCracken played for the Houston Rockets from 1972–74, and the Chicago Bulls from 1976–77.

McCracken played several years in the Continental Basketball Association (CBA) for the Hazelton Bullets, Allentown Jets, Wilkes-Barre Barons and Hawaii Volcanos.  For his four-year career, he averaged 19.1 points and 5.6 rebounds per game.  His best season was 1977–78, where he averaged 31.6 points per game for Wilkes-Barre and was named CBA MVP.

McCracken played for the Israeli team Maccabi Tel Aviv in 1978–79.

References

1950 births
Living people
Allentown Jets players
American expatriate basketball people in Israel
American expatriate basketball people in the Philippines
American men's basketball players
Basketball players from New York City
Cal State Northridge Matadors men's basketball players
Chicago Bulls players
Guards (basketball)
Hawaii Volcanos players
Houston Rockets players
Los Angeles City Cubs men's basketball players
Maccabi Tel Aviv B.C. players
Philippine Basketball Association imports
Basketball players from New Haven, Connecticut
Undrafted National Basketball Association players
Wilkes-Barre Barons players